JSB is an initialism which usually refers to the initials of Johann Sebastian Bach (1685–1750), German composer and musician of the Baroque period.

JSB may also refer to:

 Sandaime J Soul Brothers, a J-Pop dance and vocal unit from Tokyo and the third generation of the J Soul Brothers
 Japanese School of Beijing
 The Japanese School of Brussels
 The Jimmy Swift Band, Canadian Electro-Rock Quartet
 Júlio Sérgio Bertagnoli, Brazilian goalkeeper who plays for Roma
 John Seely Brown, a US researcher in organizations and computing
 John Stewart Bell, Irish physicist
 Julie Stewart-Binks, a Canadian television and sports reporter
 Judicial Studies Board, now the Judicial College